The 1976 Purdue Boilermakers football team was an American football team that represented Purdue University in the 1976 Big Ten Conference football season. In their fourth and final season under head coach Alex Agase, the Boilermakers compiled a 5–6 record (4–4 against conference opponents) and finished in a four-way tie for third place in the Big Ten standings.

Running back Scott Dierking led the team with 1,000 rushing yards and 66 points scored. He was selected by his teammates as the team's most valuable player and finished second to Rob Lytle in the voting for the Chicago Tribune Silver Football, awarded to the Big Ten's most valuable player.  Dierking was also named by the Associated Press (AP) as a second-team All-American and by the AP and United Press International (UPI) as a first-team running back on the 1976 All-Big Ten Conference football team.

Other statistical leaders included quarterback Mark Vitali with 1,184 passing yards. In addition to Dierking, three other Purdue players received honors on the 1976 All-Big Ten team: offensive guard Connie Zelencik (AP-1, UPI-2); defensive end Blane Smith (AP-1, UPI-2); and defensive back Paul Beery (AP-2, UPI-1).

Schedule

Personnel

Game summaries

Northwestern
 Scott Dierking 27 rushes, 151 yards

at Notre Dame

USC

Miami (OH)
 Scott Dierking 28 rushes, 211 yards
 John Skibinski 15 rushes, 121 yards

at Wisconsin
Paul Beery's fourth interception and Rock Supan's 20-yard field goal with a little over two minutes remaining lifted Purdue to victory.

Illinois

at Ohio State

at Michigan State

Michigan

Source: Palm Beach Post
    
    
    
    
    

PUR: Scott Dierking 38 rushes, 162 yards

at Iowa

Indiana

Statistics

Passing

Rushing

Receiving

Awards
Red Mackey Award: Mark Vitali

References

Purdue
Purdue Boilermakers football seasons
Purdue Boilermakers football